Bosc-Hyons is a commune in the Seine-Maritime department in the Normandy region in north-western France.

Geography

Population

Places of interest
 The church of St.Michel, dating from the twelfth century.
 An eighteenth-century stone cross.
Menhirs

See also
Communes of the Seine-Maritime department

References

Communes of Seine-Maritime